Carbon sequestration (or carbon storage) is the process of storing carbon (in particular atmospheric carbon dioxide) in a carbon pool. The process acts like a carbon sink, meaning it removes a greenhouse gas, or a precursor of a greenhouse gas from the atmosphere. Carbon sequestration is a naturally occurring process but it can also be enhanced or achieved with technology, for example within carbon capture and storage projects. There are two main types of carbon sequestration: geologic and biologic (also called biosequestration).

Carbon dioxide is naturally captured from the atmosphere through biological, chemical, and physical processes. These changes can be accelerated through changes in land use and agricultural practices, such as converting crop land into land for non-crop fast growing plants. Artificial processes have been devised to produce similar effects, including large-scale, artificial capture and sequestration of industrially produced  using subsurface saline aquifers or aging oil fields. Other technologies that work with carbon sequestration include bio-energy with carbon capture and storage, biochar, enhanced weathering, direct air carbon capture and sequestration (DACCS).

Forests, kelp beds, and other forms of plant life absorb carbon dioxide from the air as they grow, and bind it into biomass. However, these biological stores are considered volatile carbon sinks as the long-term sequestration cannot be guaranteed. For example, natural events, such as wildfires or disease, economic pressures and changing political priorities can result in the sequestered carbon being released back into the atmosphere. Carbon dioxide that has been removed from the atmosphere can also be stored in the Earth's crust by injecting it into the subsurface, or in the form of insoluble carbonate salts (mineral sequestration). These methods are considered non-volatile because they remove carbon from the atmosphere and sequester it indefinitely and presumably for a considerable duration (thousands to millions of years).

To enhance carbon sequestration processes in oceans the following technologies have been proposed but none have achieved large scale application so far: Seaweed farming, ocean fertilisation, artificial upwelling, basalt storage, mineralization and deep sea sediments, adding bases to neutralize acids. The idea of direct deep-sea carbon dioxide injection has been abandoned.

Terminology 
The term carbon sequestration is used in different ways in the literature and media. The IPCC Sixth Assessment Report defines it as "The process of storing carbon in a carbon pool". Subsequently, a pool is defined as "a reservoir in the Earth system where elements, such as carbon and nitrogen, reside in various chemical forms for a period of time".

The United States Geological Survey (USGS) defines carbon sequestration as follows: "Carbon sequestration is the process of capturing and storing atmospheric carbon dioxide." Therefore, the difference between carbon sequestration and carbon capture and storage (CCS) is sometimes blurred in the media. The IPCC however defines CCS as "a process in which a relatively pure stream of carbon dioxide (CO2) from industrial sources is separated, treated and transported to a long-term storage location".

Hence CCS is a technology application that utilises artificial carbon sequestration techniques.

History of the term (etymology) 
The term sequestration is based on the Latin sequestrare, which means set aside or surrender. It is derived from sequester, a depositary or trustee, one in whose hands a thing in dispute was placed until the dispute was settled. In English "sequestered" means merely secluded, withdrawn.

In law, sequestration is the act of removing, separating, or seizing anything from the possession of its owner under process of law for the benefit of creditors or the state.

Roles

In nature 
Carbon sequestration is part of the natural carbon cycle by which carbon is exchanged among the biosphere, pedosphere, geosphere, hydrosphere, and atmosphere of Earth.

Carbon dioxide is naturally captured from the atmosphere through biological, chemical or physical processes.

In climate change mitigation 

Carbon sequestration - when acting as a carbon sink -  helps to mitigate climate change and thus reduce harmful effects of climate change. It helps to slow the atmospheric and marine accumulation of greenhouse gases, which are released by burning fossil fuels and industrial livestock production.

Carbon sequestration, when applied for climate change mitigation, can either build on enhancing naturally occurring carbon sequestration or by applying artificial carbon sequestration processes. 

Within the carbon capture and storage approaches, carbon sequestration refers to the "storage" component. Here, artificial carbon storage technologies are applied, such as gaseous storage in deep geological formations (including saline formations and exhausted gas fields), and solid storage by reaction of CO2 with metal oxides to produce stable carbonates.

For carbon to be sequestered artificially (i.e. not using the natural processes of the carbon cycle) it must first be captured, or it must be significantly delayed or prevented from being re-released into the atmosphere (by combustion, decay, etc.) from an existing carbon-rich material, by being incorporated into an enduring usage (such as in construction). Thereafter it can be passively stored or remain productively utilized over time in a variety of ways. For instance, upon harvesting, wood (as a carbon-rich material) can be immediately burned or otherwise serve as a fuel, returning its carbon to the atmosphere, or it can be incorporated into construction or a range of other durable products, thus sequestering its carbon over years or even centuries.

Biologic carbon sequestration on land 

Biological carbon sequestration (also called biosequestration) is the capture and storage of the atmospheric greenhouse gas carbon dioxide by continual or enhanced biological processes. This form of carbon sequestration occurs through increased rates of photosynthesis via land-use practices such as reforestation and sustainable forest management. Land-use changes that enhance natural carbon capture have the potential to capture and store large amounts of carbon dioxide each year. These include the conservation, management, and restoration of ecosystems such as forests, peatlands, wetlands, and grasslands, in addition to carbon sequestration methods in agriculture.

Methods and practices exist to enhance soil carbon sequestration in both sectors of agriculture and forestry.

Forestry 

In terms of carbon retention on forest land, it is better to avoid deforestation than to remove trees and subsequently reforest, as deforestation leads to irreversible effects e.g. biodiversity loss and soil degradation. Additionally, the effects of af- or reforestation will be farther in the future compared to keeping existing forests intact. It takes much longer − several decades − for reforested areas to return to the same carbon sequestration levels found in mature tropical forests.

The global annual gross loss of trees is estimated to be approximately 15 billion and the global number of trees has decreased by ca 46% since the beginning of human civilization.

There are four primary ways in which reforestation and reducing deforestation can increase carbon sequestration. First, by increasing the volume of existing forest. Second, by increasing the carbon density of existing forests at a stand and landscape scale. Third, by expanding the use of forest products that will sustainably replace fossil-fuel emissions. Fourth, by reducing carbon emissions that are caused from deforestation and degradation.

Afforestation is the establishment of a forest in an area where there was no previous tree cover. Proforestation is the practice of growing an existing forest intact toward its full ecological potential. Reforestation is the replanting of trees on marginal crop and pasture lands to incorporate carbon from atmospheric  into biomass. For this carbon sequestration process to succeed the carbon must not return to the atmosphere from mass burning or rotting when the trees die. To this end, land allotted to the trees must not be converted to other uses and management of the frequency of disturbances might be necessary in order to avoid extreme events. Alternatively, the wood from them must itself be sequestered, e.g., via biochar, bio-energy with carbon storage (BECS), landfill or 'stored' by use in construction. Short of growth in perpetuity, however, reforestation with long-lived trees (>100 years) will sequester carbon for substantial periods and be released gradually, minimizing carbon's climate impact during the 21st century. Earth offers enough room to plant an additional 1.2 trillion trees. Planting and protecting them would offset some 10 years of CO2 emissions and sequester 205 billion tons of carbon. This approach is supported by the Trillion Tree Campaign. Restoring all degraded forests world-wide would capture about 205 billion tons of carbon in total, which is about two-thirds of all carbon emissions. 

During a 30-year period to 2050 if all new construction globally utilized 90% wood products, largely via adoption of mass timber in low rise construction, this could sequester 700 million net tons of carbon per year, thus negating approximately 2% of annual carbon emissions as of 2019. This is in addition to the elimination of carbon emissions from the displaced construction material such as steel or concrete, which are carbon-intense to produce.

Urban forestry
Urban forestry increases the amount of carbon taken up in cities by adding new tree sites and the sequestration of carbon occurs over the lifetime of the tree. It is generally practiced and maintained on smaller scales, like in cities.  The results of urban forestry can have different results depending on the type of vegetation that is being used, so it can function as a sink but can also function as a source of emissions. In hot areas of the world, trees have an important cooling effect through shade and transpiration. This can save on the need for air conditioning which in turn can reduce GHG emissions.

Wetlands 

Wetland restoration involves restoring a wetland's natural biological, geological, and chemical functions through re-establishment or rehabilitation. It has also been proposed as a potential climate change mitigation strategy. Wetland soil, particularly in coastal wetlands such as mangroves, sea grasses, and salt marshes, is an important carbon reservoir; 20–30% of the world's soil carbon is found in wetlands, while only 5–8% of the world's land is composed of wetlands. Studies have shown that restored wetlands can become productive  sinks and many restoration projects have been enacted in the US and around the world. Aside from climate benefits, wetland restoration and conservation can help preserve biodiversity, improve water quality, and aid with flood control.

As with forests, for the sequestration process to succeed, the wetland must remain undisturbed. If it is disturbed somehow, the carbon stored in the plants and sediments will be released back into the atmosphere and the ecosystem will no longer function as a carbon sink. Additionally, some wetlands can release non- greenhouse gases, such as methane and nitrous oxide which could offset potential climate benefits. The amounts of carbon sequestered via blue carbon by wetlands can also be difficult to measure.

Wetlands are created when water overflows into heavily vegetated soil causing plants to adapt to a flooded ecosystem. Wetlands can occur in three different regions. Marine wetlands are found in shallow coastal areas, tidal wetlands are also coastal but are found farther inland, and non-tidal wetlands are found inland and have no affects from tides. Wetland soil is an important carbon sink; 14.5% of the world's soil carbon is found in wetlands, while only 5.5% of the world's land is composed of wetlands. Not only are wetlands a great carbon sink, they have many other benefits like collecting floodwater, filtering air and water pollutants, and creating a home for numerous birds, fish, insects, and plants.

Climate change could alter soil carbon storage changing it from a sink to a source. With rising temperatures comes an increase in greenhouse gasses from wetlands especially locations with permafrost. When this permafrost melts it increases the available oxygen and water in the soil. Because of this, bacteria in the soil would create large amounts of carbon dioxide and methane to be released into the atmosphere.

The link between climate change and wetlands is still not fully known. It is also not clear how restored wetlands manage carbon while still being a contributing source of methane. However, preserving these areas would help prevent further release of carbon into the atmosphere.

Peatlands, mires and peat bogs 
Peatlands hold approximately 30% of the carbon in our ecosystem. When they are drained for agricultural land and urbanization, because peatlands are so vast, large quantities of carbon decompose and emit  into the atmosphere. The loss of one peatland could potentially produce more carbon than 175–500 years of methane emissions.

Peat bogs act as a sink for carbon because they accumulate partially decayed biomass that would otherwise continue to decay completely. There is a variance on how much the peatlands act as a carbon sink or carbon source that can be linked to varying climates in different areas of the world and different times of the year.  By creating new bogs, or enhancing existing ones, the amount of carbon that is sequestered by bogs would increase.

Agriculture 

Compared to natural vegetation, cropland soils are depleted in soil organic carbon (SOC). When a soil is converted from natural land or semi-natural land, such as forests, woodlands, grasslands, steppes and savannas, the SOC content in the soil reduces by about 30–40%. This loss is due to the removal of plant material containing carbon, in terms of harvests. When the land use changes, the carbon in the soil will either increase or decrease, this change will continue until the soil reaches a new equilibrium. Deviations from this equilibrium can also be affected by variated climate. The decreasing of SOC content can be counteracted by increasing the carbon input. This can be done with several strategies, e.g. leave harvest residues on the field, use manure as fertiliser or include perennial crops in the rotation. Perennial crops have a larger below ground biomass fraction, which increases the SOC content. Perennial crops reduce the need for tillage and thus help mitigate soil erosion, and may help increase soil organic matter. Globally, soils are estimated to contain >8,580 gigatons of organic carbon, about ten times the amount in the atmosphere and much more than in vegetation. Researchers have found that rising temperatures can lead to population booms in soil microbes, converting stored carbon into carbon dioxide. In laboratory experiments heating soil, fungi-rich soils released less carbon dioxide than other soils.

Modification of agricultural practices is a recognized method of carbon sequestration as soil can act as an effective carbon sink offsetting as much as 20% of 2010 carbon dioxide emissions annually.  (See No-till farming). Restoration of organic farming and earthworms may entirely offset CO2 annual carbon excess of 4 Gt per year and drawdown the residual atmospheric excess. (See Compost).

Carbon emission reduction methods in agriculture can be grouped into two categories: reducing and/or displacing emissions and enhancing carbon removal from the atmosphere. Some of these reductions involve increasing the efficiency of farm operations (e.g. more fuel-efficient equipment) while some involve interruptions in the natural carbon cycle. Also, some effective techniques (such as the elimination of stubble burning) can negatively impact other environmental concerns (increased herbicide use to control weeds not destroyed by burning).

As enforcement of forest protection may not sufficiently address the drivers behind deforestation – the largest of which being the production of beef in the case of the Amazon rainforest – it may also need policies. These could effectively ban and/or progressively discourage deforestation-associated trade via e.g. product information requirements, satellite monitoring like the Global Forest Watch, related eco-tariffs, and product certifications.

Urban lawns
Urban lawns can store significant amounts of carbon.  The amount stored increases over time from the most recent disturbance (e.g. house construction).

Carbon farming

Bamboo farming

Although a bamboo forest stores less total carbon than a mature forest of trees, a bamboo plantation sequesters carbon at a much faster rate than a mature forest or a tree plantation. Therefore, the farming of bamboo timber may have significant carbon sequestration potential.

Deep soil 
On a global basis it is estimated that soil contains about 2,500 gigatons of carbon. This is greater than 3-fold the carbon found in the atmosphere and 4-fold of that found in living plants and animals. About 70% of the global soil organic carbon in non-permafrost areas is found in the deeper soil within the upper 1 meter and stabilized by mineral-organic associations.

Enhancing carbon removal 
All crops absorb  during growth and release it after harvest. The goal of agricultural carbon removal is to use the crop and its relation to the carbon cycle to permanently sequester carbon within the soil. This is done by selecting farming methods that return biomass to the soil and enhance the conditions in which the carbon within the plants will be reduced to its elemental nature and stored in a stable state. Methods for accomplishing this include:
 Use cover crops such as grasses and weeds as temporary cover between planting seasons
 Concentrate livestock in small paddocks for days at a time so they graze lightly but evenly. This encourages roots to grow deeper into the soil. Stock also till the soil with their hooves, grinding old grass and manures into the soil.
 Cover bare paddocks with hay or dead vegetation. This protects soil from the sun and allows the soil to hold more water and be more attractive to carbon-capturing microbes.
 Restore degraded, marginal, and abandoned land, which slows carbon release while returning the land to agriculture or other use. Degraded land with low soil carbon pool have particularly high potential to store soil C which can be farther enhanced by proper selection of vegetation.

Agricultural sequestration practices may have positive effects on soil, air, and water quality, be beneficial to wildlife, and expand food production. On degraded croplands, an increase of 1 ton of soil carbon pool may increase crop yield by 20 to 40 kilograms per hectare of wheat, 10 to 20 kg/ ha for maize, and 0.5 to 1 kg/ha for cowpeas.

The effects of soil sequestration can be reversed. If the soil is disrupted or intensive tillage practices are used, the soil becomes a net source of greenhouse gases. Typically after several decades of sequestration, soil becomes saturated and ceases to absorb carbon. This implies that there is a global limit to the amount of carbon that soil can hold.

Many factors affect the costs of carbon sequestration including soil quality, transaction costs and various externalities such as leakage and unforeseen environmental damage. Because reduction of atmospheric  is a long-term concern, farmers can be reluctant to adopt more expensive agricultural techniques when there is not a clear crop, soil, or economic benefit. Governments such as Australia and New Zealand are considering allowing farmers to sell carbon credits once they document that they have sufficiently increased soil carbon content.

Biochar 

Biochar is charcoal created by pyrolysis of biomass waste. The resulting material is added to a landfill or used as a soil improver to create terra preta. Addition of pyrogenic organic carbon (biochar) is a novel strategy to increase the soil-C stock for the long term and to mitigate global warming by offsetting the atmospheric C (up to 9.5 Gigatons C annually). However concerns have been raised about biochar potentially accelerating release of the carbon already present in the soil.

Terra preta, an anthropogenic, high-carbon soil, is also being investigated as a sequestration mechanism. By pyrolysing biomass, about half of its carbon can be reduced to charcoal, which can persist in the soil for centuries, and makes a useful soil amendment, especially in tropical soils (biochar or agrichar).

Geologic carbon sequestration

Burial of biomass 
Burying biomass (such as trees) directly, mimics the natural processes that created fossil fuels. The global potential for carbon sequestration using wood burial is estimated to be 10 ± 5 GtC/yr and largest rates in tropical forests (4.2 GtC/yr), followed by temperate (3.7 GtC/yr) and boreal forests (2.1 GtC/yr). There is an estimated 65 GtC lying on the floor of the world's forests as coarse woody material which could be buried and costs for wood burial carbon sequestration run at 50 USD/tC which is much lower than carbon capture from e.g. power plant emissions. CO2 fixation into woody biomass is a natural process carried out through photosynthesis. This is a nature-based solution and suggested methods include the use of "wood vaults" to store the wood-containing carbon under oxygen-free conditions.

Geological sequestration 

Geological sequestration refers to the storage of CO2 underground in depleted oil and gas reservoirs, saline formations, or deep, un-minable coal beds.

Once CO2 is captured from a point source, such as a cement factory, it can be compressed to ≈100 bar into a supercritical fluid.  In this form, the CO2 could be transported via pipeline to the place of storage. The CO2 could then be injected deep underground, typically around 1 km, where it would be stable for hundreds to millions of years. Under these storage conditions, the density of supercritical CO2 is 600 to 800 kg/m3.

The important parameters in determining a good site for carbon storage are: rock porosity, rock permeability, absence of faults, and geometry of rock layers.  The medium in which the CO2 is to be stored ideally has a high porosity and permeability, such as sandstone or limestone. Sandstone can have a permeability ranging from 1 to 10−5 Darcy, with a porosity as high as ≈30%. The porous rock must be capped by a layer of low permeability which acts as a seal, or caprock, for the CO2.  Shale is an example of a very good caprock, with a permeability of 10−5 to 10−9 Darcy. Once injected, the CO2 plume will rise via buoyant forces, since it is less dense than its surroundings. Once it encounters a caprock, it will spread laterally until it encounters a gap. If there are fault planes near the injection zone, there is a possibility the CO2 could migrate along the fault to the surface, leaking into the atmosphere, which would be potentially dangerous to life in the surrounding area. Another risk related to carbon sequestration is induced seismicity. If the injection of CO2 creates pressures underground that are too high, the formation will fracture, potentially causing an earthquake.

While trapped in a rock formation, CO2 can be in the supercritical fluid phase or dissolve in groundwater/brine.  It can also react with minerals in the geologic formation to precipitate carbonates. See CarbFix.

Worldwide storage capacity in oil and gas reservoirs is estimated to be 675–900 Gt CO2, and in un-minable coal seams is estimated to be 15–200 Gt CO2.  Deep saline formations have the largest capacity, which is estimated to be 1,000–10,000 Gt CO2. In the US, there is estimated to be at least 2,600 Gt and at most 22,000 Gt total CO2 storage capacity.

There are a number of large-scale carbon capture and sequestration projects that have demonstrated the viability and safety of this method of carbon storage, which are summarized by the Global CCS Institute. The dominant monitoring technique is seismic imaging, where vibrations are generated that propagate through the subsurface. The geologic structure can be imaged from the refracted/reflected waves.

The first large-scale  sequestration project which began in 1996 is called Sleipner, and is located in the North Sea where Norway's StatoilHydro strips carbon dioxide from natural gas with amine solvents and disposes this carbon dioxide in a deep saline aquifer. In 2000, a coal-fueled synthetic natural gas plant in Beulah, North Dakota, became the world's first coal-using plant to capture and store carbon dioxide, at the Weyburn-Midale Carbon Dioxide Project. Several other sequestration projects have followed. The Energy Impact Center launched the OPEN100 project in February 2020, which is the world's first open-source blueprint for the design, construction and financing of a small, standard, pressurized water reactor. In September 2020, the US Department of Energy awarded $72 million in federal funding to support the development and advancement of carbon capture technologies.

 has been used extensively in enhanced crude oil recovery operations in the United States beginning in 1972. There are in excess of 10,000 wells that inject  in the state of Texas alone. However, transport cost remains an important hurdle. An extensive  pipeline system does not yet exist in the WCSB. Athabasca oil sands mining that produces  is hundreds of kilometers north of the subsurface Heavy crude oil reservoirs that could most benefit from  injection.

Mineral sequestration 
Mineral sequestration aims to trap carbon in the form of solid carbonate salts. This process occurs slowly in nature and is responsible for the deposition and accumulation of limestone over geologic time. Carbonic acid in groundwater slowly reacts with complex silicates to dissolve calcium, magnesium, alkalis and silica and leave a residue of clay minerals. The dissolved calcium and magnesium react with bicarbonate to precipitate calcium and magnesium carbonates, a process that organisms use to make shells. When the organisms die, their shells are deposited as sediment and eventually turn into limestone. Limestones have accumulated over billions of years of geologic time and contain much of Earth's carbon. Ongoing research aims to speed up similar reactions involving alkali carbonates.

Several serpentinite deposits are being investigated as potentially large scale  storage sinks such as those found in NSW, Australia, where the first mineral carbonation pilot plant project is underway. Beneficial re-use of magnesium carbonate from this process could provide feedstock for new products developed for the built environment and agriculture without returning the carbon into the atmosphere and so acting as a carbon sink.

One proposed reaction is that of the olivine-rich rock dunite, or its hydrated equivalent serpentinite with carbon dioxide to form the carbonate mineral magnesite, plus silica and iron oxide (magnetite).

Serpentinite sequestration is favored because of the non-toxic and stable nature of magnesium carbonate. The ideal reactions involve the magnesium endmember components of the olivine (reaction 1) or serpentine (reaction 2), the latter derived from earlier olivine by hydration and silicification (reaction 3). The presence of iron in the olivine or serpentine reduces the efficiency of sequestration, since the iron components of these minerals break down to iron oxide and silica (reaction 4).

Zeolitic imidazolate frameworks 

Zeolitic imidazolate frameworks (ZIFs) are metal-organic frameworks similar to zeolites. Because of their porosity, chemical stability and thermal resistance, ZIFs are being examined for their capacity to capture carbon dioxide. ZIFs could be used to keep industrial emissions of carbon dioxide out of the atmosphere.

Mineral carbonation 

CO2 exothermically reacts with metal oxides, producing stable carbonates (e.g. calcite, magnesite). This process (CO2-to-stone) occurs naturally over periods of years and is responsible for much surface limestone. Olivine is one such metal oxide. Rocks rich in metal oxides that react with CO2, such as MgO and CaO as contained in basalts, have been proven as a viable means to achieve carbon-dioxide mineral storage. The reaction rate can in principle be accelerated with a catalyst or by increasing temperatures  and/or pressures, or by mineral pre-treatment, although this method can require additional energy. The IPCC estimates that a power plant equipped with CCS using mineral storage would need 60–180% more energy than one without. Theoretically, up to 22% of crustal mineral mass is able to form carbonates.

Ultramafic mine tailings are a readily available source of fine-grained metal oxides that could serve this purpose. Accelerating passive CO2 sequestration via mineral carbonation may be achieved through microbial processes that enhance mineral dissolution and carbonate precipitation.

Carbon, in the form of  can be removed from the atmosphere by chemical processes, and stored in stable carbonate mineral forms. This process (-to-stone) is known as "carbon sequestration by mineral carbonation" or mineral sequestration. The process involves reacting carbon dioxide with abundantly available metal oxides – either magnesium oxide (MgO) or calcium oxide (CaO) – to form stable carbonates. These reactions are exothermic and occur naturally (e.g., the weathering of rock over geologic time periods).

CaO +  → 

MgO +  → 

Calcium and magnesium are found in nature typically as calcium and magnesium silicates (such as forsterite and serpentinite) and not as binary oxides. For forsterite and serpentine the reactions are:

 + 2  → 2  + 

+ 3  → 3  + 2  + 2 

These reactions are slightly more favorable at low temperatures. This process occurs naturally over geologic time frames and is responsible for much of the Earth's surface limestone. The reaction rate can be made faster however, by reacting at higher temperatures and/or pressures, although this method requires some additional energy. Alternatively, the mineral could be milled to increase its surface area, and exposed to water and constant abrasion to remove the inert Silica as could be achieved naturally by dumping Olivine in the high energy surf of beaches. Experiments suggest the weathering process is reasonably quick (one year) given porous basaltic rocks. 

 naturally reacts with peridotite rock in surface exposures of ophiolites, notably in Oman.

When  is dissolved in water and injected into hot basaltic rocks underground it has been shown that the  reacts with the basalt to form solid carbonate minerals. A test plant in Iceland started up in October 2017, extracting up to 50 tons of CO2 a year from the atmosphere and storing it underground in basaltic rock.

Researchers from British Columbia, developed a low cost process for the production of magnesite, also known as magnesium carbonate, which can sequester CO2 from the air, or at the point of air pollution, e.g. at a power plant. The crystals are naturally occurring, but accumulation is usually very slow.

Concrete is a promising destination of captured carbon dioxide. Several advantages that concrete offers include, but not limited to: a source of plenty of calcium due to its substantial production all over the world; a thermodynamically stable condition for carbon dioxide to be stored as calcium carbonates; and its long-term capability of storing carbon dioxide as a material widely used in infrastructure.  Demolished concrete waste or recycled concrete could be also used aside from newly produced concrete.  Studies at HeidelbergCement show that carbon sequestration can turn demolished and recycled concrete into a supplementary cementitious material, which can act as a secondary binder in tandem with Portland cement, in new concrete production.

Sequestration techniques in oceans

Marine Carbon Pumps 

The ocean naturally sequesters carbon through different processes. The solubility pump moves carbon dioxide from the atmosphere into the surface ocean where it reacts with water molecules to form carbonic acid. The solubility of carbon dioxide increases with decreasing water temperatures. Thermohaline circulation moves dissolved carbon dioxide to cooler waters where it is more soluble, increasing carbon concentrations in the ocean interior. The biological pump moves dissolved carbon dioxide from the surface ocean to the ocean’s interior through the conversion of inorganic carbon to organic carbon by photosynthesis. Organic matter that survives respiration and remineralization can be transported through sinking particles and organism migration to the deep ocean.

Seaweed farming and algae 

Seaweed grow in shallow and coastal areas, and capture significant amounts of carbon that can be transported to the deep ocean by oceanic mechanisms; seaweed reaching the deep ocean sequester carbon and prevent it from exchanging with the atmosphere over millennia. Growing seaweed offshore with the purpose of sinking the seaweed in the depths of the sea to sequester carbon has been suggested. In addition, seaweed grows very fast and can theoretically be harvested and processed to generate biomethane, via anaerobic digestion to generate electricity, via cogeneration/CHP or as a replacement for natural gas. Ideal species for such farming and conversion include Laminaria digitata, Fucus serratus and Saccharina latissima.

Both macroalgae and microalgae are being investigated as possible means of carbon sequestration. Marine phytoplankton perform half of the global photosynthetic CO2 fixation (net global primary production of ~50 Pg C per year) and half of the oxygen production despite amounting to only ~1% of global plant biomass.

Because algae lack the complex lignin associated with terrestrial plants, the carbon in algae is released into the atmosphere more rapidly than carbon captured on land. Algae have been proposed as a short-term storage pool of carbon that can be used as a feedstock for the production of various biogenic fuels.

Large-scale seaweed farming (called "ocean afforestation") could sequester huge amounts of carbon. Wild seaweed will sequester large amount of carbon through dissolved particles of organic matter being transported to deep ocean seafloors where it will become buried and remain for long periods of time. Currently seaweed farming is carried out to provide food, medicine and biofuel. In respect to carbon farming, the potential growth of seaweed for carbon farming would see the harvested seaweed transported to the deep ocean for long-term burial. Seaweed farming has gathered attention given the limited terrestrial space available for carbon farming practices. Currently seaweed farming occurs mostly in the Asian Pacific coastal areas where it has been a rapidly increasing market. The IPCC Special Report on the Ocean and Cryosphere in a Changing Climate recommends "further research attention" on seaweed farming as a mitigation tactic.

Ocean fertilisation

Artificial upwelling 
Artificial upwelling or downwelling is an approach that would change the mixing layers of the ocean. Encouraging various ocean layers to mix can move nutrients and dissolved gases around, offering avenues for geoengineering. Mixing may be achieved by placing large vertical pipes in the oceans to pump nutrient rich water to the surface, triggering blooms of algae, which store carbon when they grow and export carbon when they die. This produces results somewhat similar to iron fertilization.

Mixing layers involve transporting the denser and colder deep ocean water to the surface mixed layer. As the ocean temperature decreases with depth, more carbon dioxide and other compounds are able to dissolve in the deeper layers. This can be induced by reversing the oceanic carbon cycle through the use of large vertical pipes serving as ocean pumps, or a mixer array. When the nutrient rich deep ocean water is moved to the surface, algae bloom occurs, resulting in a decrease in carbon dioxide due to carbon intake from phytoplankton and other photosynthetic eukaryotic organisms. The transfer of heat between the layers will also cause seawater from the mixed layer to sink and absorb more carbon dioxide. This method has not gained much traction as algae bloom harms marine ecosystems by blocking sunlight and releasing harmful toxins into the ocean. The sudden increase in carbon dioxide on the surface level will also temporarily decrease the pH of the seawater, impairing the growth of coral reefs. The production of carbonic acid through the dissolution of carbon dioxide in seawater hinders marine biogenic calcification and causes major disruptions to the oceanic food chain.

Basalt storage 
Carbon dioxide sequestration in basalt involves the injecting of  into deep-sea formations. The  first mixes with seawater and then reacts with the basalt, both of which are alkaline-rich elements.

Underwater basalt offers a good alternative to other forms of oceanic carbon storage because it has a number of trapping measures to ensure added protection against leakage. These measures include "geochemical, sediment, gravitational and hydrate formation."

One possible injection site is Juan de Fuca plate. Researchers at the Lamont–Doherty Earth Observatory found that this plate at the western coast of the United States has a possible storage capacity of 208 gigatons. This could cover the entire current U.S. carbon emissions for over 100 years.

This process is undergoing tests as part of the CarbFix project, resulting in 95% of the injected 250 tonnes of CO2 to solidify into calcite in two years, using 25 tonnes of water per tonne of CO2.

Mineralization and deep sea sediments 
Similar to mineralization processes that take place within rocks, mineralization can also occur under the sea. The rate of dissolution of carbon dioxide from atmosphere to oceanic regions is determined by the circulation period of the ocean and buffering ability of subducting surface water. Researchers have demonstrated that the carbon dioxide marine storage at several kilometers depth could be viable for up to 500 years, but is dependent on injection site and conditions. Several studies have shown that although it may fix carbon dioxide effectively, carbon dioxide may be released back to the atmosphere over time. However, this is unlikely for at least a few more centuries. The neutralization of CaCO3, or balancing the concentration of CaCO3 on the seafloor, land and in the ocean, can be measured on a timescale of thousands of years. More specifically, the predicted time is 1700 years for ocean and approximately 5000 to 6000 years for land. Further, the dissolution time for CaCO3 can be improved by injecting near or downstream of the storage site.

In addition to carbon mineralization, another proposal is deep sea sediment injection. It injects liquid carbon dioxide at least 3000 m below the surface directly into ocean sediments to generate carbon dioxide hydrate. Two regions are defined for exploration: 1) the negative buoyancy zone (NBZ), which is the region between liquid carbon dioxide denser than surrounding water and where liquid carbon dioxide has neutral buoyancy, and 2) the hydrate formation zone (HFZ), which typically has low temperatures and high pressures. Several research models have shown that the optimal depth of injection requires consideration of intrinsic permeability and any changes in liquid carbon dioxide permeability for optimal storage. The formation of hydrates decreases liquid carbon dioxide permeability, and injection below HFZ is more energetically favored than within the HFZ. If the NBZ is a greater column of water than the HFZ, the injection should happen below the HFZ and directly to the NBZ. In this case, liquid carbon dioxide will sink to the NBZ and be stored below the buoyancy and hydrate cap. Carbon dioxide leakage can occur if there is dissolution into pore fluid or via molecular diffusion. However, this occurs over thousands of years.

Adding bases to neutralize acids 

Carbon dioxide forms carbonic acid when dissolved in water, so ocean acidification is a significant consequence of elevated carbon dioxide levels, and limits the rate at which it can be absorbed into the ocean (the solubility pump).  A variety of different bases have been suggested that could neutralize the acid and thus increase  absorption.  For example, adding crushed limestone to oceans enhances the absorption of carbon dioxide.  Another approach is to add sodium hydroxide to oceans which is produced by electrolysis of salt water or brine, while eliminating the waste hydrochloric acid by reaction with a volcanic silicate rock such as enstatite, effectively increasing the rate of natural weathering of these rocks to restore ocean pH.

Single-step carbon sequestration and storage 
Single-step carbon sequestration and storage is a saline water-based mineralization technology extracting carbon dioxide from seawater and storing it in the form of solid minerals.

Abandoned ideas

Direct deep-sea carbon dioxide injection 

It was once suggested that CO2 could be stored in the oceans by direct injection into the deep ocean and storing it there for some centuries. At the time, this proposal was called "ocean storage" but more precisely it was known as "direct deep-sea carbon dioxide injection". However, the interest in this avenue of carbon storage has much reduced since about 2001 because of concerns about the unknown impacts on marine life, high costs and concerns about its stability or permanence. The "IPCC Special Report on Carbon Dioxide Capture and Storage" in 2005 did include this technology as an option. However, the IPCC Fifth Assessment Report in 2014 no longer mentioned the term "ocean storage" in its report on climate change mitigation methods. The most recent IPCC Sixth Assessment Report in 2022 also no longer includes any mention of "ocean storage" in its "Carbon Dioxide Removal taxonomy".

Cost 
Cost of the sequestration (not including capture and transport) varies but is below US$10 per tonne in some cases where onshore storage is available. For example Carbfix cost is around US$25 per tonne of CO2. A 2020 report estimated sequestration in forests (so including capture) at US$35 for small quantities to US$280 per tonne for 10% of the total required to keep to 1.5 C warming. But there is risk of forest fires releasing the carbon.

Researchers have raised the concern that the use of carbon offsets – such as by maintaining forests, reforestation or carbon capture – as well as renewable energy certificates allow polluting companies a business-as-usual approach to continue releasing greenhouse gases and for being, inappropriately trusted, untried techno-fixes. This also includes the 2022 IPCC report on climate change criticized for containing "a lot of pipe dreams", relying on large negative emissions technologies. A review of studies by the Stanford Solutions Project concluded that relying on Carbon capture and storage/utilization (CCS/U) is a dangerous distraction, with it (in most and large-scale cases) being expensive, increasing air pollution and mining, inefficient and unlikely to be deployable at the scale required in time.

Society and culture

Applications in climate change policies

United States 

Starting in the mid-late 2010s, many pieces of US climate and environment policy have sought to make use of the climate change mitigation potential of carbon sequestration. Many of these policies involve either conservation of carbon sink ecosystems, such as forests and wetlands, or encouraging agricultural and land use practices designed to increase carbon sequestration such as carbon farming or agroforestry, often through financial incentivization for farmers and landowners.

The Executive Order on Tackling the Climate Crisis at Home and Abroad, signed by president Joe Biden on January 27, 2021, includes several mentions of carbon sequestration via conservation and restoration of carbon sink ecosystems, such as wetlands and forests. These include emphasizing the importance of farmers, landowners, and coastal communities in carbon sequestration, directing the Treasury Department to promote conservation of carbon sinks through market based mechanisms, and directing the Department of the Interior to collaborate with other agencies to create a Civilian Climate Corps to increase carbon sequestration in agriculture, among other things.

See also 

 Carbon budget
 Carbon cycle
 Carbon capture and storage
 Soil carbon

References

External links 

 Carbon Capture & Sequestration Technologies MIT program covers carbon capture and storage (CCS)

 
Forestry and the environment
Emissions reduction
Sustainable food system
Carbon dioxide removal
Photosynthesis
Reforestation